Morne de Vries (born 7 May 1984) is a South African former cricketer. He played in two List A matches for Boland in 2009 and 2010.

See also
 List of Boland representative cricketers

References

External links
 

1984 births
Living people
South African cricketers
Boland cricketers
People from Wellington, Western Cape
Cricketers from the Western Cape